Johanna Geertruida (Truus) van Cittert-Eymers was a Dutch physicist, historian of science, museum director and author.

Early years
Johanna Geertruida Eymers was born in Velp, in the Netherlands on 19 June 1903, the only child of teacher Johan Anton Eymers and Johanna Hermina Aleida Huetinck. She graduated from secondary school with a  HBS-b diploma in Arnhem in 1921 and moved to Utrecht to begin studying physics at the university there in 1923.

Career
Eymers began work as a researcher in the experimental physics group of Leonard Ornstein at Utrecht University in 1929 and in 1932 became the head of the teaching laboratory. Ornstein's group did both pure and applied research, with the latter often at the request of businesses or government institutions. Thus it came to be that Eymers published research about atomic emission spectra but her doctoral research concerned the illumination of an art gallery in The Hague.  Eymers graduated cum laude with a PhD in 1935 and did postdoctoral research in biophysics, specifically on luminescent bacteria.

After her marriage to van Cittert in 1938, van Cittert-Eymers's employment was terminated because of the marriage bar which was effective in the Netherlands until 1957. She resented her loss of employment and worked unpaid to assist her husband in his work as curator of the University Museum.

Personal Life
Eymers married her colleague, the physicist Pieter Hendrik van Cittert in 1938. The couple had a son, Benjamin, in 1939 who died in infancy and a daughter, in 1943 who became a biologist.

References 

Historians of physics
Women physicists
1903 births
1988 deaths
20th-century Dutch physicists
Utrecht University alumni
People from Gelderland